Attilla Adám is a Hungarian sprint canoer who competed in the 1990s. He won two medals at the ICF Canoe Sprint World Championships with a silver (K-4 500 m: 1991) and a bronze (K-2 1000 m: 1998).

References

Hungarian male canoeists
Living people
Year of birth missing (living people)
ICF Canoe Sprint World Championships medalists in kayak
20th-century Hungarian people